Miguel Ángel Martínez-González (born in 1957 in Málaga, Spain) is a Spanish medical doctor, epidemiologist, professor, and nutrition researcher He has been often a visiting scholar at Harvard T.H. Chan School of Public Health (Dept. Nutrition).

Martínez-González was the Founder and Chair (until September 2022) of the Department of Preventive Medicine and Public Health at University of Navarra at the Medical School. He was also the Principal Investigator of an Advanced Research Grant of the European Research Council for funding the PREDIMED-Plus trial.

Martínez-González has been also the Founder and 'Principal Investigator' (until June 2022) of the SUN cohort study, and he was (2006-2013) the Coordinator of the several centers included in the PREDIMED Network (a large clinical trial assessing the effects of a Mediterranean diet on the primary prevention of Cardiovascular disease. He is one of the best known worldwide experts in the Mediterranean diet and has comprehensively studied the nutritional determinants of obesity in the Spanish population. His self-help book in Spanish “Salud a ciencia cierta” (Planeta, 2018) provides useful tools to improve healthy habits and food choices.

He was awarded with the Grace Goldsmith Award  (American College of Nutrition, 2013 and the Rankin-Skatrud lecture (Univ. of Wisconsin, 2016).

In September 2016 he was appointed Adjunct Professor at the Department of Nutrition of Harvard TH Chan School of Public Health. He is the co-PI together with Frank B. Hu of two on-going grants funded by the US National Institutes of Health (NIH).

In 2022 he received the prestigious National Scientific Research Award "Gregorio Marañón" in Medicine and Health Sciences by the Ministry of Science and Innovation of the Spanish Government.

References

External links
 Department of Preventive Medicine and Public Health home page. School of Medicine. University of Navarra
 The SUN cohort study at the Department of Preventive Medicine and Public Health web page. School of Medicine. University of Navarra
 PREDIMED main web page
 Dadun (Depósito Académico Digital Universidad de Navarra)

Nutritionists
Spanish public health doctors
21st-century Spanish physicians
20th-century Spanish physicians
Academic staff of the University of Navarra
1957 births
Living people
Mediterranean diet advocates